Kaamelott is a French comedy medieval fantasy television series created, directed, written, scored, and edited by Alexandre Astier, who also starred as the main character. Based on the Arthurian legends, it followed the daily lives of King Arthur (Alexandre Astier) and his Knights of the Round Table in Camelot. The series, which originally ran for six seasons (referred to as "books"), ran from 2005 to 2009, on the network M6.

The series was preceded in 2003 by a short film, Dies iræ, with mostly the same cast and concept, which was used to pitch the idea of the series to the network, which at a time was looking to replace another successful short TV series, Caméra Café. However, Kaamelott exceeded Caméra Cafés audience only three weeks after broadcasting started. It is widely regarded as one of the best, most iconic, and most popular French TV series of all time. It has also been praised for its fidelity as, outside of comedic and linguistic liberties, it stays faithful to the mythology and historic context.

While the series takes place in the 5th century, it uses modern language and situations to create a humorous view of the Arthurian legend. However, in latter seasons, the mood becomes darker and more dramatic as Arthur's kingdom begins to disintegrate. The cast includes regular Astier collaborator Jean-Christophe Hembert (Karadoc), who directed his two subsequent one-man shows, and Astier's father Lionnel (Leodegrance), his mother Joëlle Sevilla (Dame Séli) and his half-brother Simon (Yvain).

After the end of the series in 2009, Astier started working on a film trilogy meant to conclude the story of the series. First announced in 2012 and planned for a shooting in 2013, production for the first film, Kaamelott: The First Chapter, was suspended and then repeatedly postponed due to various issues; filming eventually begun in January 2019, and it was released on July 21, 2021.

Episodes

Format and broadcast

The episode format for Kaamelott was at first very short. Unaired pilot episodes attempted a six-minute format that was rejected by the television network. Broadcast episodes from season 1 to 4 lasted about three and a half minutes, the same as Caméra Café.  These seasons are made up of a hundred of these short episodes, and originally seven such seasons were planned by Astier and M6. A season is referred to as a "livre", which means "book", in the promotional material and DVD covers.

The episodes were broadcast on M6 in France starting in 2005 in prime time (8:30PM to 8:40PM), two every weeknight evening for seasons 1–4. The week's full ten episodes were aired on the Saturday of that same week. Each such season lasted ten weeks. A week's worth of episodes is about 35 minutes, which is comparable to the American one-hour network format of ca. 44 minutes or to the British half-hour format of 30 minutes. Each episode features a teaser, opening titles, three acts, closing titles and a tag, like an American sitcom episode. Season 1 aired early in 2005, 2 in fall 2005, 3 early in 2006, and 4 in fall 2006.

Each season attracted more viewers, with records reaching about 5 million viewers each evening.

The first half of Season 5 aired in spring 2007 as two 52-minute episodes, followed by 5 weeks of 7-minute episodes (telling the same story, but with additional material) presented on the same schedule as the earlier seasons. The second half followed the same format in the fall of 2007.

Season 4 was the first season to have an overall story arc. Whereas in the earlier seasons one could watch the short episodes in any order, in Season 4 more than half the episodes were connected to a plot (and episodes 99 and 100 form a single episode with no break).

Season 5 has several intertwining plots which are presented chronologically through the whole season. This presented storytelling and editing problems which were incompatible with the old 3½-minute format, and has resulted in at least 3 different versions of Season 5: 3 52-minute episodes as televised, 50 7-minute episodes as televised, 8 52-minutes episodes in the DVD "director's cut." In the interview of the DVD, Alexandre Astier explains that is in the director's cut version that season 5 must be seen.

Season 6 was always, from the time shooting began, conceived of as a series of 40-minute episodes which would be presented as a miniseries, not cut up into shorter episodes.

Around the time that shooting began on Season 6, Astier announced that there would be no Season 7. Season 6 consists of a prequel (how Arthur became king of Britain) followed by an episode which is a sequel to Season 5.

Season 6 had a theatrical premiere as part of the "Paris fait sa comédie" festival, with a showing of seven episodes at the Grand Rex theater on March 25, 2009. The Livre was shown on M6 in October and November 2009, as a series of nine 40-minute episodes, three each Saturday night. The ratings for Livre 6 were relatively low (2.2-2.65 million), perhaps because the DVD was expected to hit the market almost immediately afterwards.

The series has also been shown on TSR2 in Switzerland, on Club RTL in Belgium and on Historia in Canada.

Astier hopes to follow the television series with a trilogy of films about Arthur. He has said that the last episode of Season 6 prepares the audience for the movie series.

Production
From the beginning, the series was shot in a widescreen format and the photography was comparable to movie quality. Thus in appearance the film is a drama rather than a sitcom.

As the series goes on, there are more and more exteriors. Seasons 1-4 take place almost entirely in or near the fortress of Kaamelott. For the first two seasons, the interiors were shot in Paris, but production moved to Lyon for the third season (entailing changes in some sets, particularly Merlin's Laboratory). The castle exteriors are filmed at Montmelas-Saint-Sorlin a medieval castle near Lyon. Parts of Seasons 5 and 6 were filmed in Brittany, and some of Season 6 was filmed in Rome at the Cinecittà Studios on the sets built for HBO's Rome.

The shooting schedule for 100 episodes was 50 days in the early seasons, expanding later to 60 days; Astier prepares the scenarios for the entire season ahead of time. In order to shoot as economically and quickly as possible, all the scenes using a particular set (especially exteriors) are shot consecutively. This gives each season an individual texture, since an exterior setting will always have the same weather, more or less, and characters wear the same clothing in a particular setting when it reappears in various episodes. The last 12 episodes of Season 2 were shot at the same time as the Season 3 episodes.

Costuming continuity is achieved in the first seasons simply by having the principal characters dressed the same in nearly every episode. Knights seated at the Round Table wear armor in the first four seasons, and in the first season they also wear armor in battle exteriors. Through the first five seasons, though new costumes are introduced, Karadoc usually wears red, Perceval blue, Lancelot off-white, and Bohort green (in a few episodes, Sir Herve appears in a yellow costume). Arthur wears blacks with deep reds and purples; Leodagan gray or gray-blue and black.

Astier usually writes the actual dialogue the night before a scene is shot. Thus if a three-minute episode includes an exterior scene, a scene in a bedroom, and a scene in the hallway, the actors would be learning their lines for the episode (along with the lines for other bits of episodes using that set) on three different days.

List of Kaamelott episodes

Content
The series title refers of course to Arthur's fortress Camelot; the peculiar spelling may come from the Old French Kamaalot, a spelling which can be found in the 13th-century French Lancelot-Grail cyclical romances. The double A forms the monogram of the show's creator, and the title generates puns based on the French word camelote ("cheap junk").

Genre
The short format of the first four seasons demanded a comic structure, with each episode ending on an ironic note of some kind which would twist the situation presented into a memorable whole. Thus the series was perceived as pure comedy—parody, satire, sitcom, or “so British,” meaning a straight-faced historical send-up in the style of Rowan Atkinson's Blackadder or Monty Python and the Holy Grail. Astier had a lot of explaining to do when Season 5 turned out to have a very dark plot, full of terrible obsessions and passions. Season 5 also involved a move towards a different format; it was broadcast both in short format and in longer sections, and the DVD cut resembled a dramatic miniseries. Season 6 was conceived and edited only in a miniseries format, with long episodes telling a story that is primarily dramatic, with incidental comic elements.

Fantasy elements have been limited, undoubtedly to some extent by the budget. However, a few episodes suggest the possibility of an intersection of the traditional Arthurian world of fairies and wizards with science fiction (see the description of Perceval's character below).

Historical and traditional content
Although the show was at first perceived as pure comedy, in many ways it follows the medieval Arthurian legends, including such traditional characters as Lancelot, Guenièvre, Bohort (Bors), Perceval, Merlin, and the Lady of the Lake, as well as the Holy Grail and the sword Excalibur. The early seasons often include twists on traditional Arthurian or medieval themes which might delight scholars; historians Eric Le Nabour and Martin Aurell have published two books based on the series, and a number of distinguished medievalists are interviewed in the 5-part documentary "Aux sources de Kaamelott" by Christophe Chabert, which accompanies the DVD sets.

Like other 21st-century Arthurian versions such as King Arthur and The Last Legion, this one emphasizes Arthur's ties with Rome and its empire. In Season 1 of Kaamelott, several characters speak of adventures in Rome, but Arthur does not seem to like Roman art, food, etc.; however, in subsequent seasons his Roman connections become important to his character and history. Season 6 tells the story of how Arthur, a policeman in Rome, comes to understand his destiny and take the crown of Britain.

Traditionally Arthurian romance includes fantasy elements, but Astier may intend to connect these eventually to science fiction. He includes references to Stargate (Perceval travels through one in episodes in Livres 2 and 3) and Star Wars (in the Livre 3 Stargate episode, Perceval visits Tatooine and brings back a light-saber, which Arthur perceives as much like Excalibur; also, in Livre 1, Bohort, the minister of protocol, sometimes seems very much like C-3PO!). The first episode entitled "Silbury Hill" suggests the operation of spiritual beings everywhere in Britain, but "Silbury Hill II" implies these are extraterrestrials and that this is known to Arthur and Léodagan. In Livre VI, we learn that Perceval was found as a baby in a crop circle, which, if these are made by space travellers from other planets, explains his affinity for stargates. Supernatural beings encountered by Arthur include Morgan Le Fay (not his sister, but involved with his eventual fate), Méléagant the emissary of gods who seem to want to destroy human rulers, and his guide the Lady of the Lake; at the beginning of Livre VI.2, a meeting of the gods whom the Lady of the Lake represents is depicted on Alpha Centauri, which implies that they at least are beings whose home is "the stars" rather than on earth. Thus, rather than recording relationships between humans and fairies, Kaamelott seems to posit relationships between Arthur and superior beings from other parts of the universe.

Like all Arthurian stories, Kaamelott twists history as well, and adds its own view of where Arthur came from and what his reign means. Roman Britain had contributed armies, generals, and maybe an emperor to the Roman empire; but in Kaamelott, Britain is an aggregate of kingdoms which perceives Rome as an occupying force and Arthur perhaps as a Pétain for having made peace with the Romans. The enemies of the historical Britons in the 5th century were the Picts to the north, the Irish (aka the Scots), and the north-Germanic tribes (Angles, Saxons, and Jutes) who had originally been brought in as mercenaries to fight the Picts. Arthur enters history as the victor of twelve battles of the British against the Saxons and is also often depicted fighting the Picts and the Scots in the north. Astier's Arthur, by contrast, apparently stays close to his fortress Kaamelott, where he is attacked by Angles and Saxons but also by Attila and his Hun, Burgundians, Ostrogoths, Vandals, Vikings, Visigoths—just about every "barbarian" people that was on the move in Europe then (though Attila was active earlier and the Vikings later), except for the Franks, ancestors of the French (though a historically Frankish leader, Chlodoric, does lead "barbarians" against Arthur). The Picts, however, represented by Arthur's mother-in-law Séli, and the Irish, represented by a federated king, are Arthur's allies in Kaamelott. The geopolitics of Kaamelott resembles that of the comic book world of Asterix—a small, primitive "Celtic" society with its druid, warrior, and secret weapon, persisting on the edges of the Roman Empire—more than traditional English or American versions of the Arthur story.

Comic devices
The main comical device of the series is to explore the distance between conventional "epic" presentations of Arthurian legend and the actual day-to-day operations of Arthur and his knights as they seek the holy Grail. Arthur is surrounded by incompetent, lazy knights, easily frightened or distracted, who fail most of their missions or who end up finding but then discarding invaluable artifacts, not understanding the nature of their quest. They speak an everyday language, full of slang and not very articulate; when someone does try to express a complex idea in a complex and exact way, he (usually Arthur, sometimes Bohort) is usually not understood and comes off as rather silly. Moreover, the characters all use the formal second person to address each other—a grammatical feature not present in English, but which produces a hilarious contrast between rude or slangy comments and the formality of expression: “Scram, sir,” or “Get in the tub with me, sir—you're filthy” or “Madam, you are a fish-faced trollop.” The verbal comedy is often pointed up by having the characters talking with their mouths full.

The series also uses slapstick for humor (e.g. a cream-cheese fight in Season 3 “La Grande Bataille”), and running gags, which may be verbal (“La Botte Secrète,” the use of the phrase “You're not wrong” to keep up one end of a conversation one does not understand), physical (“Unagi,” the completely absurd martial arts developed by Karadoc and Perceval; the silly caps the characters wear to bed), musical (the song "À la volette" which recurs through the first season), or character-specific (Merlin's conflict between his role as healer-scientist and the court's idea of a magician, Karadoc's truly Gargantuan need for food, Arthur interrupted in his bath by various incursions).  There is little sexual romance; none of the knights seems very interested in women (or other men),  and Arthur's relations with his various mistresses is more a comic device than a matter of emotion. Guenièvre, for a reason left mysterious in the first 5 seasons, remains a virgin, and this too is a source of comedy as she tries to figure out, for example, why she can't get pregnant. As the characters become familiar, dramatic or emotional situations can arise from this kind of comedy.

The series occasionally gives humorous (but always possible) explanations for historical facts. For instance, Kaamelott explains the creation of the national attire of Scotland, the kilt, by a misfortune of the king of Caledonia (modern Scotland). His armor's legs rusted when he fell into some water. It turns out to be a rule that a knight of the Round Table must wear either full body armor or his national attire, so the king of Caledonia wraps a cloth around his waist and declares it his country's official attire.

Social and psychological problems
The comic skits sometimes include serious reflections on themes like war, capital punishment and bureaucracy, among many others. The lead character, King Arthur of Britain (or Logres), has very progressive ideas, and tries to abolish the slave trade, torture, and capital punishment. His ideas usually clash with those of his father-in-law and minister of war and justice, Léodagan "Le Sanguinaire"("the Bloodthirsty"). Arthur also clashes with Lancelot, his prime minister and chief of staff, who believes that the Round Table and the Grail Quest should be for an elite, not for the self-selected group of rather ordinary men who have answered Arthur's call. Both Léodagan and Lancelot are exasperated by the shenanigans of the so-called knights, and Arthur is torn between admitting they are pretty useless and insisting that they are worthy of the Grail.

Even the idiotic characters, however, are given qualities that explain Arthur's patience with them, and make them more likable and interesting to the viewer. For instance, Perceval of Wales first appears in medieval literature in the work of Chretien de Troyes as the destined Grail Knight, but also a clumsy and foolish boy. In Kaamelott, he is the only character besides Arthur for whom Excalibur glows when it is picked up. But he is the least confident of the knights, and for good reason. He is not sure of his own name. He fails almost every mission he is trusted to undertake. He is illiterate, cannot understand the concept of a map, and insists North and South are relative concepts. On the other hand, he loves and is extremely faithful to Arthur. In Book 5, Arthur puts Excalibur back into the stone as a way of showing challengers to the throne, coming from all over the country to try to take the magical sword back out again, that only he is the rightful king. Some of Arthur's knights and allies do try their luck with the sword, but Perceval refuses and convinces his fellow knight Karadoc to do the same. Astier has described Perceval as “naïve but lucid” and (provocatively) as “the most intelligent” of the knights in his analysis of the sword in the stone situation.  Perceval dreams of space travel and at one point tries to explain the theory of special relativity to Arthur. He also has the ability to count, at a glance, people or objects (such as the stones in the fortress of Kaamelott) and to grasp the "values" of cards or objects in complicated games. In Livre 6, we learn one possible explanation for Perceval's peculiarities: his parents found him in a crop circle; in Livre III.i.22, it is strongly implied that crop circles are made by visiting extraterrestrials. So he may not be human at all.

Plot
The plot of the series up through Season 5 involves a conflict between King Arthur and his best knight, Lancelot. This begins with a few episodes in Season 1 in which we see that Lancelot is in love with Arthur's queen, Guenièvre. In Season 2 Lancelot begins to challenge Arthur; he feels that if Arthur were an effective king, justice would have been established and the knights of the Round Table would be great warriors instead of the clowns ("pantins") they actually are. In Season 3 Lancelot decides to go live in the woods as a "chevalier errant" or wandering knight, and in Season 4 his hermitage becomes a fortress and he begins recruiting men. In Season 4, Guenièvre joins Lancelot and Arthur breaks various “laws” by trying to remarry with Mevanwi, Karadoc's wife; however, at the end he retrieves his wife, who has had enough of camping out, and Lancelot despairs. Season 5's main plots show Lancelot and Arthur separately voyaging into their own pasts and futures as their conflict builds to a real cliffhanger in the final episode. We learn that these two men have been in competition for the throne of Britain since they were born. In Season 5, also, Arthur resigns his kingship and Leodagan and Karadoc attempt to rule. Season 6 consists of a flashback to a period 15 years earlier, showing how Arthur came to power in Britain as a representative of the Roman Empire but also as the chosen of the gods, the only man who can wield Excalibur. We also see how he ended up with such an odd group of "knights" and with a wife with whom he cannot be intimate.

The final episode of Season 6 brings us back to the Season 5 cliffhanger with Arthur still alive but very ill. Lancelot, given power by Arthur based on the latter's enduring trust in him, ravages the island and destroys the Round Table, both physically and spiritually. The final words of the episode, projected over a recovering Arthur, leading up to the projected movie trilogy, are "Soon Arthur will once again be a hero".

Casting

Main Cast

Knights of the Round Table

Court of Kaamelott

Other characters

Many of them are friends or family of Alexandre Astier, and have already worked with him. Family members include his father Lionnel, his half-brother Simon, his mother Joëlle Sevilla, and Simon's mother Josée Drevon. They, and many of the actors in the series, are part of the theater scene in the south of France.

Almost all the actors have been invited by Astier to directly join the show because he had previously worked with them or was familiar with their work. The few persons coming from a casting session are Anne Girouard (Guenièvre), Caroline Ferrus (Mevanwi), Vanessa Guedj (Angharad), Caroline Pascal (Demetra) and Guillaume Briat (King of the Burgundians).

Initially, Antoine de Caunes (Dagonet), Christian Bujeau (The Master of Arms) and Bruno Salomone (Caius Camillus) were only guest stars, but eventually they joined the main cast.

Like Astier (Arthur / director and writer), some actors shared their acting duties with responsibilities in the technical crew. These are Jean-Christophe Hembert (Karadoc / art director), Emmanuel Meirieu (Appius Manilius / graphic designer), Stéphane Margot (Calogrenant / stunt coordinator) and Christian Bujeau (The Master of Arms / swordmaster).

Due to the large cast and the short format, many characters, even important ones, are present only in a limited number of episodes. The only characters to appear in more than 100 of the 458 episodes are King Arthur (446), Léodagan (228), Perceval (195), Karadoc (172), Lancelot (157), Guenièvre (154), Bohort (138) and Father Blaise (105).

Guest stars
Thanks to its immediate success, the show attracted many guest stars, including director Alain Chabat, actors Christian Clavier, Tchéky Karyo and Émilie Dequenne, and TV anchor Virginie Efira.

Release date
The series premiered on M6 on January 3, 2005.

Trivia
Alexandre Astier devoted Kaamelott to the French comedy giant Louis de Funès.

Accolades

DVD details

French editions
Livres 1-3 were issued in two single-disc “tomes” to be purchased individually (each containing 50 episodes).

The 6 Livres have each been issued in a complete ("intégrale") “collector's edition” (3 discs each for Livres 1–4, 4 discs each for Livres 5–6) with bonus material including blooper reels (aka "bêtisier"), pilots, documentaries, previews of next season. This edition has a “bound-book” look (in the style of the Lord of the Rings collectors’ editions) and interior illustrations which include artwork by Jérome Jouvray.

The bonus materials ("Addendum") in the collector's sets include: Livre 1, Dies irae and the pilots, bêtisier (i.e. blooper reel); Livre 2, documentary "Aux Sources de Kaamelott: Les Moeurs et les Femmes," bêtisier, teasers for Livres 1–3; Livre 3, documentary "Aux Sources de Kaamelott: La Magie et l'Eglise," bêtisier, trailer for Livre 4 and for the first comic book; Livre 4, documentary "Aux Sources de Kaamelott: L'Art de la Guerre," bêtisier, trailer for Livre 5 and for the second comic book; Livre 5, interview with Alexandre Astier (wandering around the Cinecitta Rome set), documentary "Aux Sources de Kaamelott: La Géopolitique du Royaume," bêtisier, trailer for Livre 6; Livre 6, documentary "Aux Sources de Kaamelott: Les Chevaliers de la Table Ronde," Making Of documentary, bêtisier

Livres 5 and 6 were released as a 3-disc Blu-ray set, at the same time as the regular (4-disc) DVD set.  Since the entire series has been shot in HD, Blu-ray issues of previous Livres are possible.

All the collectors' editions have French subtitles for the deaf and hard-of-hearing as an option for Kaamelott itself. Livres 4, 5, and 6 also have English subtitles. None of the Addendum films have subtitles.

Other editions
A Canadian (Region 1) edition of Livres 1 and 2 (similar to the French Collector's edition) has been released in 2009 by Alliance Vivafilm. The edition is in French (menus, episode titles, etc.) but the episodes have English subtitles. The Addendum episodes (Dies Irae, pilots) do not have subtitles. The artwork inside the case is different from the French edition.

Spin-off
Alexandre Astier has begun publishing the scripts for the series with Éditions Télémaque:
Kaamelott Livre I Texte Intégral : Episodes 1 à 100 (2009). Includes some episodes that were not filmed.
Kaamelott Livre II Texte Intégral : Episodes 1 à 100 (2009)

Five comic books inspired by Kaamelott have been published, from November 2006 to November 2010, with stories by Alexandre Astier and art by Steven Dupré. They can be read in any order:
 L'Armée du Nécromant (The Necromancer's Army)
 Les Sièges de Transport (The Transporter Seats)
 L'Enigme du Coffre (The Mystery of the Strongbox)
 Perceval et le Dragon d'Airain (Perceval and the Iron Dragon)
 Le Serpent Géant du Lac de l'Ombre (The Giant Snake of the Shadow Lake)

Eric Le Nabour and Martin Aurell have published two books which discuss the series in terms of medieval history and Arthurian legends.
  Kaamelott: Au coeur du moyen âge. Perrin, 2007..
  Kaamelott: A la table du roi Arthur. Perrin, 2007.

4 tie-in items (Arthur's Oghma amulet, a mug, a notebook, and a 2009 calendar) were premiums with the purchase of a "Menu Top" at the Quick hamburger chain in late 2008 and early 2009.

On November 2, 2015, and after several years of conflict with the producer, Alexandre Astier announced the conflict over, and that his project of feature films - whose storyline would be following the sixth season - had started again. The shooting started in January 2019.

Notes

External links

 Kaamelott on imdb
 
 Official M6 site
 Producer's site for Kaamelott
 Historia TV in Canada site
 Casterman, publishers of the comic books, site

2005 French television series debuts
2010 French television series endings
2000s TV shows in France
2000s French comedy television series
2010s French comedy television series
Television series based on Arthurian legend
Television series set in the 5th century
French fantasy television series
M6 (TV channel) original programming